

History

St. Malachy's High School was established in 1958 as an all boys' Catholic High School. St. Malachy's became the successor school to St. Vincent's High School. St. Vincent's was opened in 1919 as an all boys' Catholic high school located next to the city's Cathedral of the Immaculate Conception. In 1954, St. Vincent's became an all girls' institution.

St. Malachy's was built on the site of Saint John's first Catholic church, St. Malachy's, established in 1814. After a fire, St. Malachy's Hall, a diocesan multipurpose facility, was erected on the site of the old chapel. As the city's population expanded, a need for more schools increased.

St. Malachy's Memorial High School became coeducational in 1982. St. Vincent's High School amalgamated with St. Malachy's in the late 1990s; this institution maintained two campuses. In 2002, St. Vincent's High School closed along with its Cliff Street location.

Today, St. Malachy's Memorial High School is owned by the Catholic Diocese of Saint John and leased by the New Brunswick Department of Education. All faculty and staff are provincial employees.

The school's memorial name commemorates members of St. Vincent's alumni killed in the First World War and the Second World War.

Facilities
2 Art Rooms
1 Culinary Kitchen
1 Auditorium
2 Audiovisual Rooms
1 Biology Lab
1 Cafeteria
1 Chemistry Lab
4 Computer Labs
Gymnasium
2 Music Rooms
2 Elevator Lifts
Guidance Centre
Resource Centre
Sexual Health Centre
1 Library/Common Room
1 Physics Lab
Student Lounge

Advanced Placement programmes
AP Biology 
AP Calculus AB  
AP Calculus BC 
AP Comparative Politics 
AP Drawing 
AP English Language 
AP English Literature  
AP European History 
AP French Language and Culture Exam 
AP Physics 
AP Research 
AP Seminar 
AP 2-D Art and Design

Notable alumni
Ivan Court, former Mayor of Saint John
Jonathan Huberdeau, NHL player
Ryan Jimmo, UFC fighter
Carl Killen, former Member of the Legislative Assembly of New Brunswick and teacher at the school
Noel Kinsella, former Senator and Speaker of the Senate
Lyman Ward, Actor
Paul Zed, former Member of Parliament
Bruce Melanson, New York Islanders draft pick

References

External links
 

High schools in Saint John, New Brunswick
Educational institutions established in 1800
Catholic secondary schools in New Brunswick